Dahamtore  is situated at about 6 km towards east of Abbottabad, Hazara, Khyber Pakhtunkhwa, Pakistan and is the largest village and union council of Abbottabad. Their language is Hindko which is the traditional mother tongue of the Hazara Division but in some villages specially Nagakki village, Gojri is also mother tongue . Dhamtour village is the gate way to places like Murree, Nathiagali, Dunga Gali, Bara Gali, Ayubia National Park, Miranjani, Mukeshpuri and most famous picnic spot of Abbottabad, Harnoi. The Union council is located in Abbottabad District in the Khyber-Pakhtunkhwa province of Pakistan.

Subdivisions
The Union Council of Dhamtour is divided into the areas of Banda Bazdar, Bandi Shoalian, Dhamtour, Guldhok, Jaswal, Nagakki, Banda Said khan and Ukhreela.

Location
Dhamtour has an average elevation of 1110 metres (3645). It is situated to the west of Abbottabad city, and borders Sheikh-ul-Bandi to the north and Nagri Bala to the south.

History
Dhamtour is an ancient city and there were markets here before British rule. Dhamtore was a main market and business centre for the surrounding areas.

Saint
In Dhamtour, there are ziarats of Shaykh or Kagir khan Baba (Ilyas khail 1545 to 1655) bin Ilyas bin Ismail bin Abdulla bin hassat or Hassa zai bin Hussain bin Mansoor bin Ashraf Gadoon and Baba Mola patt sarkar who migrated from Jalalabad Afghanistan with their followers to Gadoon or Gandaf, Swabi and Hazara to spread Islam. Another saint, also from Afghanistan Ghazi Badshah, was Saadat Sarkar, Panj Qazi saibs.

Games
Football is the major and most favorite game of this village. Some of the local clubs are Hazara Sarban FC, Pak Muhammadan FC, Sarban hockey club Shahid Cricket club, Brother eleven Cricket club, Sada bahar cricket Club.

Festival
The urs mubarak of Saian Mola Patt Qalandar who was a famous saint of that area which is celebrated for one week February 18 to February 25 each year

Tribes
Majority of residents are from the Jadoon or Sulamani Pathan tribe. Whereas other minority tribes include Syeds, Gujjars , Qazis, Awans, Mughals, Karlal, Kashmiris, Ghakkars and Abbasis.

References 

Union councils of Abbottabad District
Populated places in Abbottabad District

fr:Dhamtour